Human hunting refers to humans being hunted and killed for other persons' revenge, pleasure, entertainment, sports, or sustenance. Historically, incidents of the practice have occurred during times of social upheaval.

Historical examples 
 In Ancient Greece, the upper class of Sparta regularly practised the stalking and killing of members of their servile  helot population; such murders were carried out both by the secret police (Crypteia) as a means of keeping the helots cowed and unlikely to revolt, and as part of the  military training (agoge) for Spartan youths.
 In Europe, authorities sometimes hunted down adherents of "heretical" religious minorities, such as the Waldenses in the Alps the  Cathars in the Languedoc, Anabaptists in Germany, and the Huguenots in France.
 During the California genocide of 1846 to 1873, indigenous people were hunted down and killed for  bounties.
 During the Spanish Civil War of 1936–1939, the killing practice became popular among the sons of wealthy landowners. The hunts took place on horseback and targeted landless peasants as an extension of the White Terror. They were jokingly referred to as "reforma agraria" referencing the mass grave the victims would be dumped into and the  land reforms the lower classes had been attempting to attain.
 Anti-Japanese sentiment in the United States during the Pacific War phase of World War II included rhetoric encouraging the "hunting" of people of Japanese descent.
 Between 1971 and 1983, serial killer Robert Hansen flew many of his victims into the Alaskan wilderness, then released them so that he could "hunt" the women with a rifle and a knife.
 On July 18, 1984, before leaving to commit the San Ysidro McDonald's massacre, James Oliver Huberty told his wife that he was "going hunting... hunting for humans".

Other examples 
 Some accounts of early human violence associate the development of warfare – aggression against humans – with the practice of hunting game.
 In 2016, Daniel Wright, senior lecturer in tourism at the University of Central Lancashire, wrote a paper on the possible future of tourism where he discussed how the hunting of the poor ("hunting humans") could become a hobby of the super-rich in a future plagued by economic turmoils, ecological disasters, and global  overpopulation.

In fiction 
The topic of hunting humans has been the subject of several works of fiction.

 Probably the most famous in English is "The Most Dangerous Game", a 1924 short story by Richard Connell, which has been  adapted dozens of times for film, radio, and television.
 The 1993 action film Hard Target, starring Jean-Claude Van Damme, partly inspired by Richard Connell's book, revolves around exploited trophy hunting of homeless veterans.
 In George R. R. Martin's A Song of Ice and Fire epic fantasy-novel series and its HBO television adaptation Game of Thrones, the character Ramsay Bolton, who first appeared in the second book, A Clash of Kings (1998), loved hunting naked young women in forests with hounds as part of his sadistic sport.
 The 2005 horror film  Wolf Creek, along with its  2013 sequel, and 2016 spin-off television series, evolve around a  sadistic serial killer, Mick Taylor (played by John Jarratt), who hunts, tortures, and murders  backpacker victims for sport in the Australian Outback.
 The 2018 Jack Reacher novel  Past Tense by Lee Child has a major plot-point of a motel operator in a remote town conducting "a people hunt" for a rich clientele.
 The Brazilian film Bacurau (2019) tells the story of a small poor village in countryside Brazil called Bacurau, where white rich foreign tourists travel to hunt down the poor villagers. The movie got two nominations in Cannes, Palme d'Or and the Jury Prize, winning the latter. The film also took home the trophy for Best Picture at the 2019 Munich Festival.
 The 2020 satirical film  The Hunt revolves around the hunting of  "deplorables" by upper middle-class people in revenge for the former propagating  conspiracy theories about the latter.

See also 
 Blood sport
 Bounty hunter
 :Category:Fiction about death games
 Gladiators
 Headhunting
 Lynching
 Premeditated murder
 Psychopathy
 Sexual sadism disorder
 Thrill killing
 Witch-hunt

References 

Homicide
Hunting by game